The Water polo competition at the 2010 Central American and Caribbean Games was held in Mayagüez, Puerto Rico. 

The tournaments was scheduled to be held from 26–31 July at the Natatorio RUM in Mayagüez.

Men's tournament

Medal round

Classification round

Women's tournament

Final

External links

Events at the 2010 Central American and Caribbean Games
July 2010 sports events in North America
2010
2010 in water polo
Qualification tournaments for the 2011 Pan American Games